All extant cephalopods have a two-part beak, or rostrum, situated in the buccal mass and surrounded by the muscular head appendages. The dorsal (upper) mandible fits into the ventral (lower) mandible and together they function in a scissor-like fashion. The beak may also be referred to as the mandibles or jaws.

Fossilised remains of beaks are known from a number of cephalopod groups, both extant and extinct, including squids, octopuses, belemnites, and vampyromorphs. Aptychi – paired plate-like structures found in ammonites – may also have been jaw elements.

Composition
 
Composed primarily of chitin and cross-linked proteins, beaks are more-or-less indigestible and are often the only identifiable cephalopod remains found in the stomachs of predatory species such as sperm whales. Cephalopod beaks gradually become less stiff as one moves from the tip to the base, a gradient that results from differing chemical composition. In hydrated beaks of the Humboldt squid (Dosidicus gigas) this stiffness gradient spans two orders of magnitude.

Measurements

The abbreviations LRL and URL are commonly used in teuthology to refer to lower rostral length and upper rostral length, respectively. These are the standard measures of beak size in Decapodiformes; hood length is preferred for Octopodiformes. They can be used to estimate the mantle length and total body weight of the original animal as well as the total ingested biomass of the species.

References

Further reading

 Aldridge, A.E. (2009). Can beak shape help to research the life history of squid? New Zealand Journal of Marine and Freshwater Research 43(5): 1061–1067. 
 Bolstad, K.S. (2006). Sexual dimorphism in the beaks of Moroteuthis ingens Smith, 1881 (Cephalopoda: Oegopsida: Onychoteuthidae). New Zealand Journal of Zoology 33(4): 317–327. 
 Chen, X., H. Lu, B. Liu, Y. Chen, S. Li & M. Jin (2012). Species identification of Ommastrephes bartramii, Dosidicus gigas, Sthenoteuthis oualaniensis and Illex argentinus (Ommastrephidae) using beak morphological variables. Scientia Marina 76(3): 473–481.
 Cherel, Y. & K.A. Hobson (2005). Stable isotopes, beaks and predators: a new tool to study the trophic ecology of cephalopods, including giant and colossal squids. Proceedings of the Royal Society B: Biological Sciences 272(1572): 1601–1607. 
 Clarke, M.R. & N. MacLeod (1974). Cephalopod remains from a sperm whale caught off Vigo, Spain. Journal of the Marine Biological Association of the United Kingdom 54(4): 959–968. 
 Clarke, M.R. & L. Maddock (1988). Beaks of living coleoid Cephalopoda. In: M.R. Clarke & E.R. Trueman (eds.) The Mollusca. Volume 12. Paleontology and Neontology of Cephalopods. Academic Press, San Diego. pp. 121–131.
 Clarke, M.R. & R.E. Young (1998). Description and analysis of cephalopod beaks from stomachs of six species of odontocete cetaceans stranded on Hawaiian shores. Journal of the Marine Biological Association of the United Kingdom 78(2): 623–641. 
 Hernańdez-García, V., U. Piatkowski & M.R. Clarke (1998). Development of the darkening of Todarodes sagittatus beaks and its relation to growth and reproduction. South African Journal of Marine Science 20(1): 363–373. 
 Hernández-López, J.L. & J.J. Castro-Hernández (2001).  Fishery Bulletin 99(4): 679–684.
 Hobson, K.A. & Y. Cherel (2006). Isotopic reconstruction of marine food webs using cephalopod beaks: new insight from captively raised Sepia officinalis. Canadian Journal of Zoology 84(5): 766–770. 
 Hsu, C.-C. (2002). Geomorphometric study of Octopus and Cistopus (Cephalopoda: Octopodidae) based on landmarks of beaks. Master's thesis, National Sun Yat-sen University, Kaohsiung, Taiwan.
 Ivanovic, M.L. & N.E. Brunetti (1997). Description of Illex argentinus beaks and rostral length relationships with size and weight of squids. Revista de Investigación y Desarrollo Pesquero 11: 135–144.
 Lalas, C. (2009). Estimates of size for the large octopus Macroctopus maorum from measures of beaks in prey remains. New Zealand Journal of Marine and Freshwater Research 43(2): 635–642. 
 Lefkaditou E. & P. Bekas (2004). Analysis of beak morphometry of the horned octopus Eledone cirrhosa (Cephalopoda: Octopoda) in the Thracian Sea (NE Mediterranean). Mediterranean Marine Science 5(1): 143–149.
 Lu, C.C. & R. Ickeringill (2002).  Museum Victoria Science Reports 6: 1–65.
 Martínez, P., A. Sanjuan & Á. Guerra (2002). Identification of Illex coindetii, I. illecebrosus and I. argentinus (Cephalopoda: Ommastrephidae) throughout the Atlantic Ocean; by body and beak characters. Marine Biology 141(1): 131–143. 
 Ogden, R.S., A.L. Allcock, P.C. Watts & J.P. Thorpe (1998). The role of beak shape in octopodid taxonomy. South African Journal of Marine Science 20(1): 29–36. 
 Roeleveld, M.A.C. (2000). Giant squid beaks: implications for systematics. Journal of the Marine Biological Association of the UK 80(1): 185–187. 
 Uchikawa, K., M. Sakai, T. Wakabayashi & T. Ichii (2009). The relationship between paralarval feeding and morphological changes in the proboscis and beaks of the neon flying squid Ommastrephes bartramii. Fisheries Science 75(2): 317–323. 
 Xavier, J.C., M.R. Clarke, M.C. Magalhães, G. Stowasser, C. Blanco & Y. Cherel (2007).  Arquipélago: Life and Marine Sciences 24: 41–48.
 Xavier, J.C. & Y. Cherel (2009).  British Antarctic Survey, Cambridge. 129 pp.
 Xavier, J.C., R.A. Phillips & Y. Cherel (2011). Cephalopods in marine predator diet assessments: why identifying upper and lower beaks is important. ICES Journal of Marine Science 68(9): 1857–1864. 

Cephalopod zootomy